Tsaryovo-Zaymishche (lit. tsar's water-meadow) is a village in Vyazemsky District of Smolensk Oblast, Russia, situated on the old road from Smolensk to Moscow, west of Vyazma. In the 17th century, the village was a place where travellers to Moscow were examined by Russian custom officials and police.

A local wooden fort was taken by the Polish army during the Time of Troubles in July 1610. The Battle of Tsaryovo-Zaymishche took place on June 23–24, 1610, during the Polish–Muscovite War (1605–18). Forces of the Polish–Lithuanian Commonwealth were commanded by Hetman of Poland, Stanislaw Zolkiewski, while Russians were led by Grigory Voluyev. The battle ended in decisive Polish victory.

Prelude 
On September 29, 1609, the Commonwealth army under Chancellor Lew Sapieha reached the heavily fortified Russian city of Smolensk. The Siege of Smolensk began on October 4. Meanwhile, the Russian army of Tsar Vasili concentrated in the area of Moscow. In early May 1610, a Russian unit under Dmitry Shuisky was sent to aid the garrison of Smolensk. Near Mozhaysk, Szuisky concentrated some 15.000 soldiers, together with 25.000 poorly armed and untrained peasants. Furthermore, he was supported by 8.000 well-equipped Swedish soldiers of Jacob De la Gardie.

Battle 
On June 4, 1610, Hetman Zolkiewski ordered the army to march towards Tsaryovo-Zaymishche. Before the Poles and Lithuanians reached the town (June 23), the Russians burned it, preparing temporary strongpoints, protected by a forest and nearby swamps. A clash ensued, in which neither side managed to prevail. On the next day, more Commonwealth troops appeared and attacked, forcing the Russians to retreat. A temporary bridge was constructed, protected by Polish infantry and Zaporozhian Cossacks. In the afternoon of June 24, after a short fight, the Russians abandoned their positions, losing some 100 men.

Aftermath 
After the battle, rebel forces under Aleksander Zborowski appeared at Tsaryovo-Zaymishche. After Hetman Zolkiewski had personally guaranteed payment of their salaries, Zborowski’s soldiers joined his army. Meanwhile Russian survivors of the battle retreated to a fortified camp, which was surrounded by 700 Polish cavalry, 800 infantry, and 3.000 Cossacks. After a few days, the Russians surrendered, and Commonwealth forces immediately marched towards Klushino (see Battle of Klushino).

In 1812 it was the place where commander-in-chief Mikhail Kutuzov joined the Russian army operating against Napoleon.

References 

Rural localities in Smolensk Oblast